Clube União 1919, usually known as União de Coimbra, is a sports club in the city of Coimbra, Portugal. The club was founded on June 2, 1919 and has a large array of sports departments which includes football, futsal, basketball, aikido, volleyball and swimming.

The main football team of União de Coimbra played one season in the Portuguese First Division in the past, among big clubs like FC Porto, Benfica and Sporting Clube de Portugal. However this season coincided with hometown big club Académica de Coimbra being in Segunda Divisão as a result of being relegated the previous season, so a top division Coimbra derby never took place. 

In 2016, for legal reasons, the club from Coimbra was forced to change its name and was renamed Clube União 1919. The team currently plays in the Campeonato de Portugal. It played in the Estádio Municipal Sérgio Conceição, in Taveiro, Coimbra, which was named after the football player Sérgio Conceição and has 2500 seats.

Football: league history
The club has a single presence at the top level of Portuguese football.

In popular culture
Bruno Aleixo, a fictional character, popular in Portugal and Brazil, created by the comedy group GANA is a supporter of União de Coimbra.

Honours
Campeão Nacional 2ªDiv.: 1
Campeão Nacional 3ªDiv.: 1
Campeão Distrital da Associação de Futebol de Coimbra: 1
Winner of the Taça da Associação de Futebol de Coimbra: 1

References

External links
 Official website
 zerozero

Association football clubs established in 1919
Uniao de Coimbra
Football clubs in Portugal
1919 establishments in Portugal
Primeira Liga clubs